Rajaguru Subramanian he is Tamilnadu born Kabaddi player, born 22 June 1987 is representative for India in the sport of Kabaddi. He was a member of the kabaddi team that won a gold medal in the 2014 Asian Games in Incheon.He has also played in Pkl (Pro Kabaddi League) In season 6 for U Mumba ,now he is promoted by u mumba as a head coach now he is the new coach for u mumba to pro kabaddi season 8

References

Living people
1987 births
Indian kabaddi players
Asian Games medalists in kabaddi
Kabaddi players at the 2014 Asian Games
Asian Games gold medalists for India
Medalists at the 2014 Asian Games